Emilie Hovden (born 5 April 1996) is a Norwegian handball player who currently plays for Viborg HK and the Norwegian national team.

She also represented Norway at the 2015 Women's Under-19 European Handball Championship, placing 6th and at the 2013 Youth European Championship, placing 7th.

Achievements
World Championship:
Winner: 2021
European Championship:
Winner: 2022
Norwegian League
Silver Medalist: 2019/2020, 2020/2021, 2021/2022
Norwegian Cup:
Finalist: 2019

Individual awards
 Topscorer of Eliteserien 2019/2020: (161 goals)
 All-Star Right Wing of Eliteserien: 2019/2020
 Best Player of Eliteserien: 2019/2020

References

Norwegian female handball players
1996 births
Living people
Sportspeople from Bergen
21st-century Norwegian women